The Pineapple Bowl was a college football bowl game played during the 1940s and early 1950s in Honolulu, Hawaii, at Honolulu Stadium. The game featured the then-Hawaii Rainbows and an invited team from the mainland.

History
The Pineapple Bowl was a renamed continuation of the Poi Bowl, which had first been played in January 1936. After the attack on Pearl Harbor, the bowl game was suspended for five years. The final edition of the game was played in January 1952. It was held on New Year's Day except in 1950, when the holiday fell on a Sunday.

Following the demise of the Pineapple Bowl, the all-star Hula Bowl was first played in January 1960. The University of Hawaii attempted to revive the Pineapple Bowl in 1980, but the NCAA Special Events Committee turned down their request. The Aloha Bowl was later approved and first played in December 1982.

Game results
The University of Hawaii went 3–5 in the Pineapple Bowl. The only other team to appear more than once in the bowl was Oregon State, who went 2–0.

While NCAA records indicate the first playing of the Pineapple Bowl was in January 1940, contemporary newspaper reports indicate the January 1939 edition (which the NCAA lists as a Poi Bowl) was also played using that name.

The media guide of the now-Hawaii Rainbow Warriors football program does not include any Pineapple Bowl games in their bowl game history. Results do appear in the NCAA's bowl game history, in the "Unsanctioned Or Other Bowls" section.

See also
 Poi Bowl (1936–1939)
 Aloha Bowl (1982–2000)
 Oahu Bowl (1998–2000)
 Seattle Bowl (2001–2002)
 Hawaii Bowl (2002–present)
 List of college bowl games

References

 
American football in Hawaii
College sports in Hawaii
Defunct college football bowls
1940 establishments in Hawaii
Recurring sporting events established in 1940
1952 disestablishments in Hawaii
Recurring sporting events disestablished in 1952